Seema Rahmani is an American film actress, television presenter, writer, producer, director, singer, event host, poet, and a philanthropist.

Early life
While her family background links to Pune, India, Seema was born and raised in Kuwait. Her father worked with an oil company and her mother as an English teacher in a Kuwaiti government high school. At age 15, she moved to the U.S., completed high school in Newark, New York, a Bachelor of Science with a minor in Mathematics at State University of New York at Fredonia, and an M.A. in Marketing-Advertising from Emerson College in Boston. She enjoyed a marketing-advertising and public relations corporate career for a few years before she started her acting career.

Career
In 1997, Seema left a PR corporate career in Los Angeles, California and joined theater, thus beginning her acting career. She soon landed stints in two television series - Alias for ABC and Roswell for Warner Brothers 2000–2001. 
Rahmani moved to India in 2003 to work with choice filmmakers in films such as Vinod Pande's true-story inspired Sins in 2005, where she was noticed for her range and fluency in exploring a character's vulnerability, Zee TV Films' Arjun Varma, and Missed Call by Mridul Toolsidas and Vinay Subrmanium, which was adjudged the Best International film at Israel's Red Sea International Film Festival. Rahmani's performance received accolades in the super-hit comedy film Loins of Punjab Presents  in 2007, which won the Audience Award for best feature film at the Indian Film Festival of Los Angeles. These films gave her recognition and drew the attention of independent filmmakers looking for an "effortlessly natural" actor and a "quintessential Indian face".

In 2005, two years as an actor in the Indian film industry, and in the wake of a media sting operation that brought acts of incredulous unprofessionalism by Bollywood power-personalities to the forefront of media discussions and debates, Rahmani contributed to public awareness by authoring a politically incorrect but honest personal account of ungentlemanly behaviours she faced. The article was lauded and published by Outlook Magazine (10th anniversary edition) and The Times of India. Rahmani said she felt "a sense of responsibility to silence talks that denied compromising of ethics in what should be an artistic, safe, fair, and respectful environment for actors to work in."

Her work between 2007 and 2012 as host of the super hit TV show on domestic, street, and wild animals -- titled Heavy Petting, airing on NDTV Good Times -- brought her recognition both as a television presenter and spokesperson for compassion towards animals and animal rights. Her show traveled the length and breath of India, eradicating culturally induced fears regarding animals, while educating and inspiring viewers to care for them.

As a film actor, Rahmani again demonstrated her versatility in the critically acclaimed 2012 independent film Good Night Good Morning and in the lighthearted comedy Love Wrinkle-free.

In 2013 Seema revisited the theater circuit after ten years, this time in Delhi, writing, directing, producing and acting. Her play Life Like Rainbow Grey -- sponsored by and premiering at The American Embassy in New Delhi in celebration of Women's International Day -- was very well received. Performing also in The Contemporary Arts Festival at The French Embassy, the play is a true to life account of Rahmani's experiences with children who were wards of the state of California, rescued from abusive homes and living in a Catholic church group home. The play, which includes doses of original poetry and song, delves into the subject of neglected and abused children, healthy parenting, and marriages. Rahmani went on to produce skits for children and co-wrote and directed several plays while in Delhi.

As an author, her literary offerings include "The Journey of a Truth Seeker", a memoir; "Hold the Space of Truth", a spiritual self-help and healing handbook; "Seven Wonders, Short Stories for our Young and Older Young"; "One Wonders, Short Stories for our Youngins"; "Hone Your Craft", a compilation of her original monologues and skits; and "Life Like Rainbow Grey", a play. Her book of poetry "Euphoria, A Journey Unravels..." published through a Kolkata publishing house in 2003, was deeply appreciated by former president of India, A.P.J. Abdul Kalam, as expressed in a personal letter to her, listing poetry he resonated with.

She has produced the timeless music album "Rab Se...", a collection of carefully crafted, empowering, loving lullabies and songs in Hindi "for children and their adults" [released January 2016]. The album features revered and respected singers from India, namely, Rekha Bhardwaj, Roop Kumar Rathod, Suresh Wadkar, ghazal maestro Sudeep Banerjee, Aditi Paul, Dilip Shankar and herself. Its music and songs have been appreciated for their unique therapeutic effect on both children and adults.

Rahmani hosted the 21st Annual World Travel Awards Asia and Australasia Ceremony in 2014, in India, an awards event called "The Oscars of the travel industry" by The Wall Street Journal.

Humanitarian Work

Rahmani's animal-rescue efforts began during her childhood in Kuwait. As an adult, since the early 90s, she has been involved in animal welfare in India, with major focus on stray canine-and-feline birth control, and the rescue, treatment, rehabilitation, and adoption of strays in various pockets of Mumbai, Pune, Delhi, and Rajasthan. 

Year 2008, in Mumbai, Rahmani restructured the largest government-run stray-dog sterilization program, transforming inhumane practices into ethical ones. In 2010, in Panchgani, she spearheaded the critical and sensitive handling of abandoned animals, rehomed large rescued animals, and assisted in the legal acquisition of land for an animal rescue center.

In 2009, Rahmani received a vision to help uplift people who are psychologically suffering, through counselling and healing techniques. "Your Center" was at the core of this vision which aims to help liberate and heal people of all ages and walks of life by helping them discover the power of their truest, deepest, eternal inner center. She propelled forward the work of this vision since the year 2012, in cities in India and in Los Angeles, U.S.A.

In 2014, Seema adopted an underprivileged "jugghi" in South Delhi, aiming to replace the negativity, hostility, and violent behaviours she witnessed among its youth with a peaceful, positive, and productive attitude towards life and each other. She worked with the slum's children and several parents, empowering them through counselling and discussions. She brought to the children yoga, meditation, after-school education, creative arts, informative field trips, and soulful, fun outings in nature. Her goals were received wholeheartedly by over 40 children and their families. The upliftment of their morale and lives, through an empowered sense of self, was achieved over a span of three years.

In 2018, Rahmani was invited to run Blue Cross Society Animal Hospital so as to restructure and lead the management of Pune city's largest ABC program in alliance with the Pune Municipality Corporation government body. Her vision and experience with animal rescue work delivered the largest number of stray dog population control surgeries per month combined with the highest ethical standard of operations since the founding of the hospital in 1994, thus helping curb both rabies incidents and inhumane treatment of dogs within the communities.

Filmography

Films

Television

References

External links

Rahmani's lullaby music album for children and adults
Youtube channel with Rahmani's underprivileged children in Delhi

Living people
1969 births
Actresses from Pune
People from Kuwait City
American film actresses
American television actresses
Indian emigrants to the United States
American actresses of Indian descent
American expatriate actresses in India
Actresses in Hindi cinema
Actresses in Hindi television
American humanitarians
State University of New York at Fredonia alumni
Emerson College alumni
21st-century American actresses